Kwak Hee-Ju (born 5 October 1981) is a South Korean footballer who plays as a defender who last played for Suwon Samsung Bluewings.

At first, he did not enjoy much success with the team, but since early of 2004, he has become one of the key players of defence of Suwon Samsung Bluewings.

He was member of South Korea that parted East Asian Cup 2008 and World Cup qualifier of 2006 and 2010.

Club statistics

Honours

Club

Suwon Samsung Bluewings
 K-League (2): 2004, 2008
 K-League runner-up: 2006
 Korean FA Cup (2): 2009, 2010
 Korean FA Cup runner-up (2): 2006, 2011
 K-League Cup (2): 2005, 2008
 Korean Super Cup: 2005
 A3 Champions Cup: 2005
 Pan-Pacific Championship: 2009

National team
South Korea
 EAFF East Asian Cup: 2008

Individual
 2004 K-League Yearly Best 11 (Defender)
 2008 Windsor Awards Korean Football Best 11 (Defender)

External links
 
 National Team Player Record 
 
 
 

1981 births
Living people
Association football defenders
South Korean footballers
South Korean expatriate footballers
South Korea international footballers
Suwon Samsung Bluewings players
FC Tokyo players
Al-Wakrah SC players
K League 1 players
J1 League players
Qatar Stars League players
Expatriate footballers in Japan
South Korean expatriate sportspeople in Japan
South Korean Buddhists
People from Gangneung